Brooks Green is a hamlet in the Shipley civil parish of the Horsham District of West Sussex, England. The hamlet is within the Southwater South and Shipley ward for West Sussex County Council.

Brooks Green has existed at least since 1724, and in 1850 contained about nine buildings.

The hamlet is centred on the south to north Coolham to Barns Green minor road, at the point where Coolham Road becomes Trout Lane at a staggered junction with Emms Lane, running west, and Lackenhurst Lane, running east. The rural aspect is of farms, fields, orchards, managed woodland and isolated and stream-fed ponds. Two streams, Lackenhurst Gill at the south-east and another at the north-west which feeds Parson's Brook, both feed the River Adur,  to the south. In the north of the hamlet is a residential area of new-build properties, a caravan park, a motor services company, and a dog boarding kennels.

References

External links

Horsham District
Hamlets in West Sussex